Dysphania is a plant genus in the family Amaranthaceae, distributed worldwide from the tropics and subtropics to warm-temperate regions.

Description 

The species of genus Dysphania are annual plants or short-lived perennials.  They are covered with stalked or sessile glandular hairs and therefore with aromatic scent (or malodorous to some people). Some species have uniseriate multicellular trichomes, rarely becoming glabrous. The stems are erect, ascending, decumbent, or prostrate and mostly branched.

The alternate leaves are mostly petiolate, (the upper ones sometimes sessile). The leaf blade is linear, lanceolate, oblanceolate, ovate, or elliptic, often pinnately lobed, with cuneate or truncate base, entire, dentate, or serrate margins.

The inflorescences are terminal, loose, simple or compound cymes or dense axillary glomerules. Bracts are absent or reduced. 
Flowers are bisexual (rarely unisexual), with up to five tepals connate only basally or fused to form sac,  one to five stamens, and a superior ovary with one to three filiform stigmata.

The fruit is often enclosed in perianth. The membranous pericarp is adherent or nonadherent to the horizontal or vertical, subglobose, or lenticular seed. The seed coat is smooth or rugose. The annular or incompletely annular embryo is surrounding the copious farinose perisperm.

Chromosome numbers 
Chromosome numbers reported are 2n=16, 18, 32, 36, and 48.

Photosynthesis pathway 
All species of genus Dysphania are C3 plants with normal leaf anatomy.

Distribution 
The genus Dysphania is distributed worldwide from the tropics and subtropics to warm-temperate regions. In Europe, the species are native, archaeophytes, or naturalized, in the northern regions absent or rarely adventive.

Systematics 
The genus Dysphania belongs to the tribe Dysphanieae in the subfamily Chenopodioideae within the plant family Amaranthaceae. According to phylogenetic research, it is related to genera Suckleya and Cycloloma.

Dysphania was first published in 1810 by Robert Brown in Prodromus Florae Novae Hollandiae, p. 411-412. Type species is Dysphania littoralis R.Br..

The genus Dysphania primarily comprised 7-10 Australian species. Sometimes they were grouped as an own family, Dysphaniaceae Pax & Hoffmann, or even regarded as members of families Illecebraceae and Caryophyllaceae. In 2002, Sergei L. Mosyakin & Steven E. Clemants extended the genus for the glandular species of Chenopodium subgenus Ambrosia A.J.Scott.

Synonyms for Dysphania R.Br. are Neobotrydium Moldenke, Roubieva Moq. and Teloxys Moq..

The genus Dysphania consists of four sections with about 40 species:
 Dysphania sect. Adenois (Moq.) Mosyakin & Clemants: 15 species, native in South and Middle America, now distributed worldwide from the tropics to warm-temperate regions:
 Dysphania ambrosioides (L.) Mosyakin & Clemants (Syn.: Chenopodium ambrosioides L., Dysphania anthelmintica (L.) Mosyakin & Clemants), Epazote, Mexican-tea: native in North- and South America, naturalized in other continents.
 Dysphania burkartii (Aellen) Mosyakin & Clemants (Syn.: Chenopodium ambrosioides L. subsp. burkartii Aellen, Chenopodium burkartii (Aellen) Vorosch., Dysphania dunosa (L.E.Simón) Mosyakin & Clemants)
 Dysphania chilensis (Schrad.) Mosyakin & Clemants (Syn.: Chenopodium chilense Schrad., Chenopodium ambrosioides var. chilense (Schrad.) Spegazzini; Chenopodium ambrosioides var. vagans (Standley) J.T.Howell; Dysphania andicola (Phil.) Mosyakin & Clemants, Dysphania sooana (Aellen) Mosyakin & Clemants): native in Argentina and Chile.
 Dysphania multifida (L.) Mosyakin & Clemants, Syn.: Chenopodium multifidum L., Roubieva multifida (L.) Moq., Teloxys multifida (L.) W.A.Weber, Dysphania macrocarpa (Phil.) Mosyakin & Clemants), Cut-leaf goosefoot, small-leaved wormseed: native in South America, introduced from the tropics to warm-temperate regions.
 Dysphania oblanceolata (Speg.) Mosyakin & Clemants (Syn.: Chenopodium ambrosioides L. var. oblanceolatum Speg., Chenopodium oblanceolatum (Speg.) Giusti)
 Dysphania tomentosa (Thouars) Mosyakin & Clemants (Syn.: Chenopodium tomentosum Thouars)
 Dysphania venturii (Aellen) Mosyakin & Clemants (Syn.: Chenopodium ambrosioides L. subsp. venturii Aellen, Chenopodium venturii (Aellen) Cabrera)
 Dysphania sect. Botryoides (C.A.Mey.) Mosyakin & Clemants: with 3 subsections:
 Dysphania sect. Botryoides subsect. Botrys (Aellen & Iljin) Mosyakin & Clemants: with 9 species, worldwide, native in southern North America, northern South America, southern Eurasia and Africa.
 Dysphania botrys (L.) Mosyakin & Clemants, Syn.: Chenopodium botrys L.), Jerusalem-oak, feather-geranium: native from Middle Europa to China (Xinjiang), naturalized or cultivated in other temperate regions.
 Dysphania nepalensis (Colla) Mosyakin & Clemants (Syn.: Chenopodium nepalense Colla), in Central Asia
 Dysphania procera (Hochst. ex Moq.) Mosyakin & Clemants (Syn.: Chenopodium procerum Hochst. ex Moq.)
 Dysphania pseudomultiflora (Murr) Verloove & Lambinon (Syn.: Chenopodium foetidum Schrad. subsp. pseudomultiflorum Murr): In South Africa.
 Dysphania schraderiana (Schult.) Mosyakin & Clemants, Syn. Chenopodium schraderianum Schult.)
 Dysphania sect. Botryoides subsect. Incisa (Standley) Mosyakin & Clemants: With 1 species in southwestern North America and in South America:
 Dysphania dissecta (Moq.) Mosyakin & Clemants (Syn.: Ambrina dissecta Moq., Chenopodium dissectum (Moq.) Standley)
 Dysphania sect. Dysphania, with 8 species in Australia:
 Dysphania glandulosa Paul G.Wilson, in Australia
 Dysphania glomulifera Paul G.Wilson (Syn.: Dysphania myriocephala Benth., Chenopodium myriocephalum (Benth.) Aellen), in Australia
 Dysphania kalpari Paul G.Wilson, in Australia
 Dysphania littoralis R.Br., in Australia
 Dysphania plantaginella F.Muell., in Australia
 Dysphania platycarpa Paul G.Wilson, in Australia
 Dysphania rhadinostachya (F.Muell.) A.J.Scott (Syn.: Chenopodium rhadinostachyum F. Muell.), in Australia
 Dysphania simulans F.Muell. & Tate ex Tate, in Australia
 Dysphania sphaerosperma Paul G.Wilson, in Australia
 Dysphania valida Paul G.Wilson, in Australia
 Dysphania sect. Orthospora (R.Br.) Mosyakin & Clemants: with 7 species in New Zealand and Australia, some species introduced in other regions:
 Dysphania carinata (R.Br.) Mosyakin & Clemants, Syn.: Chenopodium carinatum R.Br.): native in Australia, naturalized in other continents.
 Dysphania cristata (F.Muell.) Mosyakin & Clemants), Syn.: Blitum cristatum F.Muell., Chenopodium cristatum (F.Muell.) F.Muell.): native in Australia, naturalized in other continents.
 Dysphania melanocarpa (J.M.Black) Mosyakin & Clemants (Syn.: Chenopodium carinatum R.Br. var. melanocarpum J.M.Black, Chenopodium melanocarpum (J.M.Black) J.M.Black), black crumbweed
 Dysphania pumilio (R.Br.) Mosyakin & Clemants, Syn.: Chenopodium pumilio R.Br., Teloxys pumilio (R.Br.) W.A.Weber), Clammy goosefoot, small crumbweed: native in Australia, naturalized in other continents.
 Dysphania pusilla Mosyakin & Clemants (Syn.: Chenopodium pusillum Hook. f.)
 Dysphania saxatilis (Paul G.Wilson) Mosyakin & Clemants (Syn.: Chenopodium saxatile P.G.Wilson)
 Dysphania truncata (Paul G.Wilson) Mosyakin & Clemants (Syn.: Chenopodium truncatum P.G.Wilson)
 Not yet grouped to a section:
 Dysphania congolana (Hauman) Mosyakin & Clemants (Syn.: Chenopodium glaucum L. var. congolanum Hauman, Chenopodium congolanum (Hauman) Brenan), in Africa
 Dysphania graveolens (Willd.) Mosyakin & Clemants
 Dysphania minuata (Aellen) Mosyakin & Clemants (Syn.: Chenopodium minuatum Aellen)
 Dysphania stellata (Standley) Mosyakin & Clemants (Syn.: Chenopodium stellatum S.Watson): This species has 6-8 tepals.

Excluded species: Teloxys aristata (Syn. Dysphania aristata (L.) Mosyakin & Clemants, Chenopodium aristatum L.).

Usage 
Epazote or Mexican tea (Dysphania ambrosioides) and American wormseed (Dysphania anthelmintica) are medicinal herbs. Epazote is used as a tisane and as an insecticide. Some species of Dysphania are used as dye.

References 
 Steven E. Clemants & Sergei L. Mosyakin (2003): Dysphania - online. In: Flora of North America Editorial Committee (ed.): Flora of North America North of Mexico. Volume 4: Magnoliophyta: Caryophyllidae, part 1. Oxford University Press, New York, p. 267. (chapters description, distribution, systematics)
 Sergei L. Mosyakin, Steven E. Clemants (2008): Further Transfers of glandular-pubescent species from Chenopodium subg. Ambrosia to Dysphania (Chenopodiaceae). In: Journal of the Botanical Research Institute of Texas Vol.2, Nr. 1, p. 425–431. (chapter systematics)
 Gelin Zhu, Sergei L. Mosyakin & Steven E. Clemants (2003): Chenopodiaceae: Dysphania – online. In: Wu Zhengyi, Peter H. Raven, Deyuan Hong (Hrsg.): Flora of China. Volume 5: Ulmaceae through Basellaceae. Science Press u.a., Beijing u.a., p. 376. (chapter description, vernacular name)
 species and distribution at GRIN, retrieved 30 November 2011

External links 

 Distribution Map for Europe

 
Amaranthaceae genera
Chenopodioideae